Edgard de Larminat (29 November 1895 – 1 July 1962) was a French general, who fought in two World Wars. He was one of the most important military figures who rejoined the renegade Free French forces under the British in 1940. He was awarded the Ordre de la Libération.

Larminat joined the French Army at the outbreak of the First World War as a private and by 1915 had completed his officer training and later fought at the Battle of Verdun.  During the course of the war, Larminat was wounded three times and gassed once.  He achieved the rank of captain by the close of the war.

Completing his military studies at Saint-Cyr in October 1919, Larminat volunteered to serve in the colonial infantry.  In this capacity, he saw combat against rebels in Morocco, and later served in Mauritania and Indochina.  At the outbreak of the Second World War, Larminat was a lieutenant-colonel stationed in the Levant.

Larminat was still serving in the Middle East when France surrendered in June, 1940. He refused to obey the French Government and was imprisoned in Damascus, but escaped and fled to join the renegade Free French group in Palestine. He was later active in Africa and during the Allied invasion of Italy and France, serving as the commander of the 1st Free French Division in north Africa, the Free French Pursuit Corps in Italy, and the Free French II Corps and Atlantic Army Detachment in France. De Larminat is held responsible for the controversial bombardment and destruction of the French city of Royan in January 1945.

After the war, Larminat served in several positions, notably as the Inspector-General of overseas troops and the inspector of colonial forces. He also served as the first president of the Association of the Free French.  Larminat retired to the reserves in 1956 and was briefly recalled to active duty in 1962 to chair the Court of Military Justice charged with judging the actions of French officers who took part in the rebellion of colonial troops in Algeria in 1961.  Before the court convened, Larminat committed suicide on 1 July 1962.

Awards and decorations

France
 Ordre de la Libération – Decree of 1 August 1941
 Grand Cross of the Legion of Honour
 Croix de Guerre 1914-1918 (4 citations)
 Croix de Guerre 1939-1945 (4 citations)
 Croix de guerre des Théâtres d'opérations extérieures (1 citation)
 Croix du Combattant Volontaire
 Médaille de la Résistance with rosette
 Commander of the Ordre du Mérite combattant
 Colonial Medal with Clasp "Morocco"
 Médaille commémorative de la guerre 1914–1918
 Commemorative Medal for the Levant
 Médaille Interalliée 1914–1918
 Médaille des Évadés
 Medal for the Wounded

Foreign
 Commander of the Legion of Merit (USA)
 Order of the Bath (UK)
 Commander of the Order of Leopold (Belgium)
 Belgian Croix de Guerre 1914-1918 with Palm
 Grand Cross of the Virtuti Militari (Poland)
 Grand Cross of the Order of the Black Star (Benin)
 Grand Cross of the Order of the Dragon of Annam

Works
 Que sera la France de demain, n.p. 1943
 L'Armée dans la Nation, Paris 1945
 Bertie Albrecht, Pierre Arrighi, General Brosset, D. Corticciato, Jean Prevost, 5 parmi d'autres, Paris 1947
 L'Armée européenne, Paris 1952
 Chroniques irrévérencieuses, Paris 1962

References

https://web.archive.org/web/20100827123649/http://www.ordredelaliberation.fr/fr_compagnon/556.html

1895 births
1962 deaths
People from Alès
French military personnel of World War I
French Army generals of World War II
French military leaders
Free French Forces
Free French military personnel of World War II
Grand Croix of the Légion d'honneur
Recipients of the Croix de Guerre 1914–1918 (France)
Recipients of the Croix de Guerre 1939–1945 (France)
Recipients of the Croix de guerre des théâtres d'opérations extérieures
Companions of the Liberation
Recipients of the Resistance Medal
Honorary Knights Grand Cross of the Order of the Bath
Recipients of the Croix de guerre (Belgium)
Commanders of the Legion of Merit
Grand Crosses of the Virtuti Militari
Recipients of the Order of the Dragon of Annam